Parachaetolopha collatisaeta is a moth in the family Geometridae first described by Olga Schmidt in 2002. It is found in Papua New Guinea.

References

Moths described in 2002
Larentiinae